Jumbo is an unincorporated community in Chilton County, Alabama, United States.

History
A post office called Jumbo was established in 1882, and remained in operation until it was discontinued in 1904.

A variety of dolomite, called the Jumbo Dolomite, is named for the community due to its presence in exposures and quarries near Jumbo.

References

Unincorporated communities in Chilton County, Alabama
Unincorporated communities in Alabama